Laixi railway station (Chinese: 莱西站) is a railway station in Laixi, Qingdao, Shandong, China.

History
The station was opened on 28 December 2014 along with the Qingdao–Rongcheng intercity railway. The station was closed from 10 July 2019 for reconstruction as part of the Weifang–Laixi high-speed railway.

In the future, the station will be the start of the Laixi–Rongcheng high-speed railway, which will provide a faster journey to Rongcheng.

Name
The station opened as Laixi North, despite being situated to the south of Laixi City. In 2020, in preparation for reopening, the name was changed to Laixi railway station. The original Laixi railway station was renamed Laixi South.

References

Railway stations in Shandong
Railway stations in China opened in 2014